Stationary fuel-cell applications (or stationary fuel-cell power systems) are applications for fuel cells that are either connected to the electric grid (distributed generation) to provide supplemental power and as emergency power system for critical areas, or installed as a grid-independent generator for on-site service.

Applications
In 2012 more than  fuel-cell systems were shipped all over the world — in residential homes, hospitals, nursing homes, hotels, office buildings, schools, utility power plants.

(Micro)combined heat and power
Micro combined heat and power, "mCHP" or "micro cogeneration" is a so-called distributed energy resource (DER). The installation is usually less than 5 kWe in a house or small business. Instead of burning fuel to merely heat space or water, some of the energy is converted to electricity in addition to heat.  This electricity can be used within the home or business or, if permitted by the grid management, sold back into the electric power grid. 

Delta-ee consultants stated in 2013 that with 64% of global sales the fuel cell micro-combined heat and power passed the conventional systems in sales in 2012. In 2012, over  units were sold in Japan as part of the Ene Farm project. With a Lifetime of around 60,000 hours. For PEM fuel cell units, which shut down at night, this equates to an estimated lifetime of between ten and fifteen years. For a price of $22,600 before installation. For 2013 a state subsidy for  units is in place.

Emergency power systems
Emergency power systems are a type of fuel cell system, which may include lighting, generators and other apparatus, to provide backup resources in a crisis or when regular systems fail. They find uses in a wide variety of settings from residential homes to hospitals, scientific laboratories, data centers, telecommunication equipment and modern naval ships.

Uninterrupted power supply
An uninterruptible power supply (UPS) provides emergency power and, depending on the topology, provide line regulation as well to connected equipment by supplying power from a separate source when utility power is not available. It differs from an auxiliary power supply or standby generator, which does not provide instant protection from a momentary power interruption.

Codes and standards
Stationary fuel cell applications is a classification in FC hydrogen codes and standards and fuel cell codes and standards. The other main standards are Portable fuel cell applications and Fuel cell vehicle.
Fuel cell gas appliances up to 70 kW
Installation permitting guidance for hydrogen and fuel cells stationary applications
Standard for the installation of stationary fuel cell power systems

See also
Glossary of fuel cell terms

References

External links
 Stationary fuel cell systems analysis

Fuel cells
Hydrogen technologies